Proctocopsis is a genus of moths in the subfamily Arctiinae. It contains the single species Proctocopis forficula, which is found in Colombia.

References

Arctiinae